Liverpool F.C. Reserves is the reserve team of Liverpool F.C. It is the most senior level of the Liverpool academy beneath the first team. In the summer of 2012, the whole English reserve football system was overhauled and replaced with an Under 21 league system, the Professional Development League. Liverpool's reserve team became the Liverpool under 21 team and competes in the Professional Development League 1 which is also known by its sponsorship name of Barclays under 21 Premier League and Premier League 2. The team generally consists of Under-21 players at the club but at times senior players also play for the reserves when they are recuperating from injury. Following the introduction of new regulations from the 2012–13 season, only three outfield players and one goalkeeper over the age of 21 can play for the reserves regularly.

Liverpool F.C. Academy is the youth set up Liverpool Football Club. It trains players from the U6 age group up to the U21 squad. The academy has separate head coaches in charge of development in the U6-U9, U10-U11, U12-U14 and U15-U16 age groups. At U21 and U18 level there are dedicated coaching teams managed by Michael Beale with the U21 position vacant as of 2 March 2020. Alex Inglethorpe was promoted from U21 manager to Academy Director in the summer of 2014 and hold overall responsibility for operation of the academy. The academy has won the FA Youth Cup, a competition for players of age 15 to 18, four times in 1996, 2006, 2007 and 2019.

Liverpool F.C. Academy is considered to be one of the best and one of the most prolific football academies both in England and in the world.  Various current and past Liverpool players have graduated through the academy with the likes of Billy Liddell, Ronnie Moran, Ian Callaghan, Phil Thompson, Robbie Fowler, Steve McManaman, Michael Owen, Jamie Carragher, Steven Gerrard and Trent Alexander-Arnold, among many others.

Reserve team
Liverpool Reserves played in Premier Reserve League. The Reserves won the regional division title in 2000 and again 2008 winning also the national league that year. It competed in the Lancashire Combination from 1896 to 1911, with the exception of the 1898–99 season, in which it joined The Combination. From 1911 on, it took part in the Central League until becoming inaugural members of the Premier Reserve League North in 1999. The team also participated in the Liverpool Senior Cup and the Lancashire Senior Cup; the last time it took part in them was the 2009–10 season when it also won both competitions.

The last reserve team manager was Rodolfo Borrell, who was appointed in July 2011 and led the reserve team during its final season before taking over the newly formed under-21 side in July 2012. The reserves last played their home games at Prenton Park (the home of Tranmere Rovers); in previous seasons the team has also played at the club's academy, the Halliwell Jones Stadium (home of Warrington Wolves), Haig Avenue (the home of Southport), Totally Wicked Stadium (the home of St Helens R.F.C.) and the Racecourse Ground (home of Wrexham).

The most successful Liverpool Reserves manager was Roy Evans. Evans spent most of his playing career as a reserve team player, making only 11 appearances for the first team. After an injury ended his career in 1974, he was appointed manager of the reserves by Bob Paisley. Evans subsequently led the reserves to victory in a series of Central League championships, including three in his first three seasons, a four in a row sequence from 1978, and two more in the early 1980s. Throughout the history of Liverpool FC, many of the club's best known players have progressed through the reserve team. These include people who at one point were first team squad members including Trent Alexander-Arnold, Steven Gerrard, Robbie Fowler, Michael Owen, Steve McManaman, Jamie Carragher and Raheem Sterling.

The Academy

In 1998, a new state-of-the-art Youth Academy was opened in Kirkby, Metropolitan Borough of Knowsley. It replaced the older, more informal youth system, and enables the club to focus their youth development and scouting, employing new techniques and FA standards.

Scouts attend many local youth matches looking for talented boys. A boy will then be invited to attend training sessions at the Academy. They are currently taken in as young as the age of six. Former England International player Jamie Carragher started at Liverpool when he was aged just nine, with Michael Owen joining at eleven, and Steven Gerrard joining at the age of eight.

On the walls of the indoor centre hang the words 'Technique', 'Attitude', 'Balance', and 'Speed'. 'TABS' is the key word preached at The Academy. Academy director Alex Inglethorpe has said the remit of the academy is to produce physically, technically, tactically and mentally elite players with enough quality to represent the senior side in the Champions League. Liverpool won the 2005 Champions league with two locally born academy graduates starting in the final.

Academy partnerships
The Academy has a long-lasting affiliation with MTK Budapest's Sándor Károly Football Academy and maintains a number of football schools worldwide through partnerships with football clubs and commercial and sports organisations. LFC International Football Academy currently has branches in Scandinavia (Norway, Denmark, Sweden, Finland, and Gran Canaria during winter), America (Texas and Plymouth, the latter through an affiliate with CS United Soccer Club), Egypt (Cairo), South Africa (Durban and Johannesburg), China (Guilin), India (Pune, in cooperation with DSK Shivajians), and Japan (Tokyo). Previously schools were also run in Abuja, Belfast, Boston, Charlotte, Cyprus, Dublin, Hong Kong, Iceland, Jakarta, Katwijk, Lisbon, Madrid, Malta, Mumbai, Manila, Nairobi, Saint Vincent, and Singapore.

Academy squad

Out on loan

Players listed in bold have made at least one senior first-team appearance.

Staff

Current coaching and medical staff

 Academy director: Alex Inglethorpe 
 Head of Academy business: Andrew Powlesland 
 Head of Academy football operations: Nick Marshall 
 Education manager: Caitlin Hawkins 
 Head Academy physiotherapist & U23s head physio: Paul Kelly 
 U23s physiotherapist: Scott McAuley 
 U23s manager: Barry Lewtas 
 U23 Assistant Manager & U16 Manager 
 Jonathan Robinson 
 U23s fitness coach: Vacant	
 U23s goalkeeping coach: Mark Morris 
 Goalkeeping coach: Ian Dunbavin 
 Head of development analysis:vacant 
 Head of coach development: Martin Diggle 
 Academy chief scout: Dave Moss 
 Senior Academy scout: Matthew Newberry 
 Assistant Academy recruitment co-ordinator: Frederico Paciencia 
 U18s manager: Marc Bridge-Wilkinson 
 U18 fitness coach: John Hill 
 U18 Lead physiotherapist: Phil Bolland 
 U18 assistant physiotherapist: Gregg Blundell 
 U18s goalkeeping coach: Neil Edwards 
 Performance coach: Yvie Ryan 
 Nutritionist: Tom Maynard 
 Sports therapist: Joe Lewis 
 Floating physiotherapist: Tony Jones 
 Rehabilitation fitness coach: Paul Squires 
 Assistant Academy sports scientist: Oliver Morgan 
 Academy doctor: Dr Jim Moxon 
 Head of recruitment 14s+: Dan Hargreaves 
 Head of recruitment 9-13: Terry John 
 Head of local recruitment: Steve Gorst 
 Manchester scout 9-13: John Newby 
 U18s performance analyst: Scott Mason 
 U23 individual coach/analyst: Ray Shearwood 
 U15-U16s performance analyst: Brad Wall 
 U14-8 analyst: Daniel Spearitt 
 U10-U12 Lead coach: Michael Yates 
 U12 coach: Phil Charnock 
 U10 coach: Josh Wesselby 	
 U6-U9 Lead coach: Anthony Ryan 
 U9 coach: John Thompson 
 Lead pre-Academy coach: James Williams 

In addition, the Academy employ staff from the first-team.

Reserve team manager history

  Bob Paisley (1954–1957)
  Joe Fagan (1957–1974)
  Roy Evans (1975–1984)
  Chris Lawler (1984–1986)
  Phil Thompson (1986–1992)
  Sammy Lee (1993–1998)
  Joe Corrigan (1998–2002)
  Hughie McAuley (2003–2006)
  Gary Ablett (2006–2009)
  John McMahon (2009–2011)
  José Segura (caretaker) (2011)
  Rodolfo Borrell (2011–2012)
  Alex Inglethorpe (2012–2014)
  Michael Beale (2014–2016)
  Mike Garrity (caretaker) (2016–2017)
  Neil Critchley (2017–2020)
  Barry Lewtas (2020–present)

Awards

Liverpool Academy Players' Player of the Year

Players in bold are still playing for Liverpool.

Honours

Reserves

League Champions
 The Central League: 16(1956–57, 1968–69, 1969–70, 1970–71, 1972–73, 1973–74, 1974–75, 1975–76, 1976–77, 1978–79, 1979–80, 1980–81, 1981–82, 1983–84, 1984–85, 1989–90, 
 Premier Reserve League National: 1(2007–08)
 Premier Reserve League North: 2(1999–00, 2007–08)
 Lancashire Combination: 2(1896–97, 1899–00)

Cup Winners
 Liverpool Senior Cup: 40(1893, 1901, 1902, 1903, 1905, 1907, 1909, 1910*, 1912*, 1913, 1915, 1920, 1925, 1927, 1929, 1930, 1934*, 1936*, 1937, 1939, 1942, 1943, 1946, 1947, 1948, 1951, 1952, 1962, 1964*, 1968, 1977, 1980, 1981, 1982*, 1997, 1998, 2002, 2004, 2009, 2010)
 Lancashire Senior Cup: 13(1919, 1920*, 1924, 1931, 1933, 1944, 1947, 1956, 1959, 1973, 2010, 2017, 2022)
 Liverpool Challenge Cup: 4(1954, 1959, 1960, 1961)

Youth

League Champions
 Lancashire League Division One: 6(1965–66, 1967–68, 1968–69, 1971–72, 1977–78, 1982–83)
 Lancashire League Division Two: 7(1961–62, 1965–66, 1967–68, 1972–73, 1975–76, 1976–77, 1992–93)
 Lancashire League Division Three: 1(1960–61)

Cup Winners
 FA Youth Cup: 4(1996, 2006, 2007, 2019)
 Liverpool Youth Cup: 3(1954, 1956, 1958)
 Lancashire Division One League Cup: 3(1960, 1966, 1967)
 Lancashire Division Two League Cup: 5(1962, 1966, 1967, 1973, 1980)
 Lancashire Division Three League Cup: 1(1961)

*Asterisk denotes a shared title.

Noted graduates

Established at Liverpool

Liverpool's youth system has been successful over the years; many players who have come through it have gone on to feature in the first-team. The following players have gone on to play over ten competitive matches for the first team.

Pre-WW2
  Harold Barton
  Cyril Done
  Alf Hanson
  Jack Parkinson
  Syd Roberts

1940s

  Bill Jones
  Billy Liddell
  Jimmy Payne
  Eddie Spicer

1950s
  Alan A'Court
  Eric Anderson
  Gerry Byrne
  Bobby Campbell
  Don Campbell
  Jimmy Melia
  Ronnie Moran
  Roy Saunders

1960s
  Alf Arrowsmith
  Phil Boersma
  Ian Callaghan
  Bobby Graham
  Chris Lawler
  Ian Ross
  Tommy Smith
  Phil Thompson

1970s
  Jimmy Case
  David Fairclough
  Colin Irwin
  Sammy Lee
  John McLaughlin

1980s
  Gary Ablett
  Mike Marsh
  Steve Staunton
  Ronnie Whelan

1990s
  Jamie Carragher
  Robbie Fowler
  Steven Gerrard
  Dominic Matteo
  Steve McManaman
  Michael Owen
  David Thompson
  Stephen Wright

2000s

  Dani Pacheco
  Darren Potter
  Emiliano Insúa
  Jay Spearing
  Martin Kelly
  Neil Mellor
  Stephen Warnock

2010s
  Andre Wisdom
  Brad Smith
  Jack Robinson
  Jon Flanagan
  Jordon Ibe
  Pedro Chirivella
  Raheem Sterling
  Suso
  Sheyi Ojo
  Trent Alexander-Arnold
  Ben Woodburn
  Curtis Jones
  Neco Williams
  Caoimhín Kelleher

2020s
  Stefan Bajcetic
  Nathaniel Phillips
  Rhys Williams

Established elsewhere
Many of the former Liverpool youth and reserve team players have found success with other clubs. None of these players became established members of the Liverpool first team.

1950s
  Joe Maloney
  Keith Burkinshaw

1960s
  Ted MacDougall

1970s
  John Gidman
  Tommy Tynan

1980s

  Alan Harper
  Colin Russell
  Craig Hignett

  Dave Watson
  Howard Gayle
  John Durnin

  Mark Seagraves
  Mike Newell
  Nigel Adkins

  Paul Jewell
  Brian Mooney
  Ken DeMange

  Kevin Sheedy

1990s

  Nicky Rizzo
  Alex Watson

  Phil Charnock
  Ryan Lowe

  Jim Magilton
  Paul Dalglish

  Tony Warner
  Danny Williams

  Gareth Roberts
  Jason Koumas

2000s

  Besian Idrizaj
  Adam Hammill
  Alan Navarro
  Calum Woods
  Charlie Barnett
  Craig Lindfield

  Danny Guthrie
  Danny O'Donnell
  David Mannix
  David Raven
  Jack Hobbs
  James Smith

  Jon Newby
  Jon Otsemobor
  Lee Peltier
  Paul Anderson
  Ryan Crowther
  Steven Gillespie

  Antonio Barragán
  Daniel Ayala
  Francisco Manuel Duran
  Miki Roqué
  Daniel Sjölund
  Christopher Buchtmann
  Marvin Pourié

  Jimmy Ryan
  Richie Partridge
  Ronald Huth
  Ryan Flynn
  Astrit Ajdarević
  Zak Whitbread
  Layton Maxwell

2010s

  Gerardo Bruna
  Dean Bouzanis
  Jake Brimmer
  Nikolay Mihaylov
  Jakub Sokolík
  Martin Hansen
  Nikola Saric
  Henoc Mukendi
  Adam Morgan
  Adam Phillips
  Alex Whittle
  Andy Firth
  Anthony Glennon
  Cameron Brannagan
  Connor Randall
  Conor Coady

  Craig Roddan
  Daniel Trickett-Smith
  David Amoo
  Herbie Kane
  Jack Dunn
  Jason Banton
  Jerome Sinclair
  Joe Maguire
  Jordan Lussey
  Jordan Rossiter
  Lloyd Jones
  Matty Virtue
  Michael Ngoo
  Nathan Eccleston
  Ovie Ejaria
  Robbie Threlfall

  Ryan Kent
  Sam Hart
  Shamal George
  Stephen Darby
  Tom Brewitt
  Tom Ince
  Tyrell Belford
  Yan Dhanda
  Madger Gomes
  Mikel San José
  Rafael Páez
  Sergi Canós
  Lauri Dalla Valle
  Stephen Sama
  Toni Silva
  Yalany Baio

  Andras Simon
  Kristóf Polgár
  Krisztián Adorján
  Krisztián Németh
  Patrik Poór
  Péter Gulácsi
  Zsolt Poloskei
  Alex O'Hanlon
  Conor Masterson
  Corey Whelan
  Daniel Cleary
  Joseph Rafferty
  Kristján Emilsson
  Victor Pálsson
  Bobby Adekanye
  Edvard Tagseth

  Ryan McLaughlin
  João Carlos Teixeira
  Paulo Alves
  Rafael Camacho
  Toni Gomes
  Alex Cooper
  Gary Mackay-Steven
  George Johnston
  Ryan Fulton
  Alexander Kačaniklić
  Kristoffer Peterson
  Yusuf Mersin
  Marc Pelosi
  Villyan Bijev
  Danny Ward
  Harry Wilson
  Jordan Williams

2020s

  Tom Clayton
  Liam Coyle
  Luis Longstaff
  Ki-Jana Hoever
  Morgan Boyes

References

Sources
 Who's Who of Liverpool (2006): Tony Matthews
 LFCHistory.net

External links

 News about the Academy at the Official Club Website
 Under-21s Fixtures and Results
 Under-18s Fixtures and Results

 Liverpool Academy News Blog by Scott Taylor
 Under-21s League Table
 Under-18s League Table
 The Liverpool FC academy way – These Football Times (2015)

Reserves and Academy
Football academies in England
Metropolitan Borough of Knowsley
Sport in the Metropolitan Borough of Wirral
Lancashire Combination
Lancashire League (football)
Premier League International Cup
UEFA Youth League teams
NextGen series